GSC may refer to:

Business
 Global Security Challenge, a business competition
 Golden Screen Cinemas, in Malaysia
 Golden Star Resources, a Canadian gold mining company
 Good Smile Company, a Japanese manufacturer of hobby products
 GSC Enterprises, Inc., an American retailer and financial services company
 GSC Systems, a Canadian propeller manufacturer

Education 
 Gainesville State College, now a campus of the University of North Georgia, in Oakwood, Georgia, United States
 Glasgow Science Centre, in Scotland
 Glassboro State College, now Rowan University, in Glassboro, New Jersey, United States
 Glenville State College, in Glenville, West Virginia, United States
 Global Studies Consortium, an international academic association
 Government Saadat College, in Karatia, Tangail, Bangladesh
 Government Science College (disambiguation)
 Granite State College, in New Hampshire, United States
 Greensboro Science Center, in North Carolina, United States

Entertainment 
 Game Show Congress, a conference series
 Granite State Challenge, an American quizbowl television show
 The Great Space Coaster, an American children's television show
 Gunsmith Cats, a Japanese seinen manga
 GSC Game World, a Ukrainian video game developer
 Pokémon Gold, Silver and Pokémon Crystal

Government and military 
 Air Force Global Strike Command, a major command of the United States Air Force
 General Service Corps, of the British Army
 Geological Survey of Canada

Science and technology 
 GSC (gene), encoding the goosecoid protein
 Global Standards Collaboration
 Genomic Standards Consortium
 Group switching centre, a former British telephone exchange
 GSC bus, a computer bus
 Guangzhou Science City, in Guangdong, China
 Guiana Space Centre, in French Guiana
 Guide Star Catalog, an astronomical catalogue
 Google Search Console, a webmasters' tool

Sports
 Game score, a baseball statistic
Gezira Sporting Club, largest multi-sport facility in Egypt
 Ghana Super Cup, a football competition
 Girls' Sports Club, a women's sports club in Singapore 1929-1996
 Glenmore Sailing Club, in Calgary, Alberta, Canada
 Goslarer SC 08, a German football club
 Gulf South Conference, a college athletic conference in the southeastern United States

Other uses
 Gascon language, spoken in France
 Glenwood Springs station, a railway station in Colorado, United States
 Greater Sylhet Development and Welfare Council in UK, a British charity
 Green Schools Campaign, a renewable energy campaign in Malaysia
 Guided Self-Change
 Girl Scout Cookies
 Gulf Stream Council, of the Boy Scouts of America